William Patrick McPeak (July 24, 1926 – May 7, 1991) was an American football player and coach in the National Football League (NFL). He was drafted by the Pittsburgh Steelers in the 16th round of the 1948 NFL Draft, playing nine seasons for them. He also was the head coach of the Washington Redskins and offensive coordinator of the Miami Dolphins.

Playing career
Born in New Castle, Pennsylvania, McPeak was a star defensive end for the University of Pittsburgh.  He was drafted by the Pittsburgh Steelers where he played from 1949 to 1957. During the final two years of his playing career he also became an assistant coach for the team.

Head coaching career
In 1959, McPeak joined the Washington Redskins as an assistant under head coach Mike Nixon.  After Nixon's dismissal following the 1960 NFL season, McPeak was promoted to head coach and general manager, and remained in that position until 1965.  Although the Redskins did not have a winning season under McPeak with an overall 21-46-3 record, the team acquired players, many of whom would become future Hall of Famers, that would eventually play a part in their later winning years. They include Sonny Jurgensen Bobby Mitchell, Charley Taylor, Jerry Smith, Len Hauss, and Chris Hanburger.

Later coaching and scouting
After spending the 1966 season as a color commentator for St. Louis Cardinals games on CBS, McPeak joined the Detroit Lions as an offensive coordinator in 1967, a position he held until 1972 when he moved on to the Miami Dolphins to replace Howard Schnellenberger who became head coach of the Baltimore Colts. His tenure in Miami would last for only two seasons due to complications suffered after a stroke, which he spent several years recovering from. He would later join the New England Patriots after returning to health, where he became director of scouting for twelve years.

McPeak died of a heart attack on May 7, 1991 at the age of 64 at his home in Foxboro, Massachusetts.

References

External links

Bill McPeak, Football Scout, 64

1926 births
1991 deaths
Detroit Lions coaches
Eastern Conference Pro Bowl players
Miami Dolphins coaches
National Football League announcers
National Football League general managers
New England Patriots executives
New England Patriots scouts
Pittsburgh Panthers football players
Pittsburgh Steelers coaches
Pittsburgh Steelers players
People from New Castle, Pennsylvania
Players of American football from Pennsylvania
St. Louis Cardinals (football) announcers
Washington Redskins coaches
Washington Redskins executives
Washington Redskins head coaches
National Football League offensive coordinators